Daou al-Salhine al-Jadak was a field commander for the forces of the National Transitional Council of Libya during the 2011 Libyan civil war. Jadak was imprisoned for more than 18 years by Muammar Gaddafi's regime and led anti-Gaddafi forces in their battle for control of Bani Walid  which eventually succeeded in October. Jadak came from Bani Walid himself. He had told AFP two days before his death that he had been imprisoned for more than 18 years for helping organise a 1993 rebellion.

Death

Jadak was among 11 NTC fighters killed in a heavy rocket barrage at Bani Walid by Pro-Gaddafi forces his car was struck by a rocket as he headed towards the front. This was confirmed by NTC chief negotiator Abdullah Kenshil.

References

People of the First Libyan Civil War
Libyan Muslims
2011 deaths
Year of birth missing